Werner Liebrich (18 January 1927 – 20 March 1995) was a German footballer who played in the centre back position. He is notable for his role in the West Germany triumph in the 1954 FIFA World Cup, and spending his entire playing career of almost twenty years with hometown club 1. FC Kaiserslautern, with whom he also briefly coached.

Early life
Liebrich was brought up in Kaiserslautern to a worker's family who were members of the Social Democratic German party SPD.

Career
At club level, Liebrich played solely for 1. FC Kaiserslautern, and breaking into the first team in the 1940s. He was in the 1950s part of the team that won the German championship in the 1951 and 1953 seasons.

He appeared sixteen times for the West Germany national team, and was a member of the West Germany team that won the 1954 FIFA World Cup, in which he played in the final. He was the player who injured Hungarian team captain Ferenc Puskás during the two teams' first game in the tournament in the group stage. Puskás was forced to miss the next two matches in the tournament, but played in the final against Germany, not wholly fit, in which the Germans won 3–2, Hungary's first defeat in four years.

In 1950, A.C. Milan offered him a contract which he declined to stay at his hometown club.

Apart from winning the German championship with Kaiserslautern in 1951 and 1953, the pinnacle of Liebrich's career were his defensive performances during the 1954 FIFA World Cup, especially in the quarter final against Yugoslavia. After the 1954 World Cup, one of his best performances came in the game against England at Wembley on 1 December 1954. He effectively marked English centre forward Ronnie Allen and also helped out covering Stanley Matthews.

Liebrich retired from playing in 1962, after nearly twenty years with his hometown club; however he came back for a coaching stint in the 1964–65 season and was celebrated as saving his club from relegation.

Death
In March 1995, Liebrich died of heart failure aged 68, in Kaiserslautern.

References

External links
 
 
 

1927 births
1995 deaths
People from Kaiserslautern
People from the Palatinate (region)
German footballers
Footballers from Rhineland-Palatinate
Germany international footballers
1954 FIFA World Cup players
FIFA World Cup-winning players
1. FC Kaiserslautern players
German football managers
1. FC Kaiserslautern managers
Association football defenders